The R830 road is a regional road in Dún Laoghaire–Rathdown, Ireland.

The official definition of the R830 from the Roads Act 1993 (Classification of Regional Roads) Order 2012 states:

R830: Foxrock - Dún Laoghaire, County Dublin

Between its junction with N11 at Stillorgan Road and its junction with R829 at Glenageary Road Upper via Kill Lane and Kill Avenue all in the county of Dún Laoghaire–Rathdown</p>

and

between its junction with R829 at Mounttown Upper and its junction with R119 at Cumberland Street via York Road all in the county of Dún Laoghaire–Rathdown.

See also
Roads in Ireland
National primary road
Regional road

References

Regional roads in the Republic of Ireland
Roads in County Dublin